Safiul Rahaman (born 27 April 1993) is an Indian footballer who plays as a defender for Mohammedan in the I-League. He is popularly known as Ripon.

Career statistics

Club

Honours
Mohammedan Sporting
Calcutta Football League: 2021

References

Living people
1993 births
Footballers from Kolkata
Association football defenders
Indian footballers
Mohammedan SC (Kolkata) players
I-League players
I-League 2nd Division players
Peerless SC players